The Rabbi Goes West is a 2019 documentary film about a Chabad Hasidic rabbi and his family who move to Montana. The film's directors are Amy Geller and Gerald Peary. The film covers the lives of the Chabad rabbi's efforts to increase Jewish observance among the Jews living in the state, as well as reactions from the non-Orthodox rabbis living in Montana.

See also 
 The Frisco Kid
 Outback Rabbis
 Chabad in film and television

References

External links 

Chabad in the United States
Films about Orthodox and Hasidic Jews
Jews and Judaism in Montana
2019 documentary films
2019 films
Films about Chabad
American documentary films
Documentary films about Montana
Documentary films about Jews and Judaism in the United States
2010s English-language films
2010s American films